Pichittra Thongdach (born 14 April 1987) is a Thai former professional tennis player.

Thongdach made the main draw of the 2003 Pattaya Women's Open as a lucky loser and was beaten in the first round by Anastasia Rodionova, in three sets. A winner of two ITF doubles titles, Thongdach played varsity tennis in the United States for Boise State University from 2007 to 2010.

ITF finals

Doubles (2–3)

References

External links
 
 

1987 births
Living people
Pichittra Thongdach
Boise State Broncos women's tennis players
Pichittra Thongdach